The Fourfold is a Canadian animated short film, directed by Alisi Telengut and released in 2020. Animated through pastel drawings that are erased and redrawn and narrated by Telengut's grandmother, the film illustrates the traditional Mongolian view of nature.

The film received a Canadian Screen Award nomination for Best Animated Short at the 9th Canadian Screen Awards, and a Prix Iris nomination for Best Animated Short Film at the 23rd Quebec Cinema Awards.

References

External links
 

2020 films
2020 animated films
Canadian animated short films
Films about Asian Canadians
2020 short films
2020s animated short films
2020s Canadian films